HMS Enterprise (sometimes spelled Enterprize) was a 24-gun sixth-rate (named Enterprise or L'Entreprenante) of the French Navy captured by HMS Triton (also spelt as Tryton) on 7 May 1705. She was registered as a Royal Navy ship on 1 June 1705 and commissioned shortly afterwards. She served in the Mediterranean and with Admiral Byng's squadron at the Downs, She was wrecked in 1707 with the loss of all hands.

Enterprise was the first named vessel in the Royal Navy.

Specifications
She was captured on 2 May and registered as a Royal Naval vessel on 1 June 1705. Her tonnage calculation was  tons. Her armament was twenty 6-pounders on the upper deck with and four 4-pounders on the quarterdeck all on wooden trucks.

Commissioned Service
She was commissioned in 1705 under the command of Commander John Paul, RN for service in the Mediterranean then was assigned to Admiral Byng's squadron for the winter of 1706/07 in the Downs. On 17 May 1707 Commander William Davenport assumed command.

Loss
She was wrecked off Thornton, Lancashire (near Blackpool) with the loss of all hands on 12 October 1707.

Citations

References
 Winfield, British Warships in the Age of Sail (1603 – 1714), by Rif Winfield, published by Seaforth Publishing, England © 2009, EPUB , Chapter 6, The Sixth Rates, Vessels acquired from 18 December 1688, Sixth Rates of 20 guns and up to 26 guns, Ex-French Prizes (1704–09), Enterprise
 Colledge, Ships of the Royal Navy, by J.J. Colledge, revised and updated by Lt Cdr Ben Warlow and Steve Bush, published by Seaforth Publishing, Barnsley, Great Britain, © 2020, e  (EPUB), Section E (Enterprise)
 Lyon, The Sailing Navy List: All the Ships of the Royal Navy, Built, Purchased and Captured, 1688-1860, by David Lyon, published by Conway Maritime Press, 1993, Enterprise, page 192

 

1700s ships
Corvettes of the Royal Navy
Entreprise
Ships built in France
Captured ships
Naval ships of the United Kingdom